Philip Dennis Dokes (September 7, 1955 – December 7, 1989) was a National Football League (NFL) defensive end/defensive tackle who played for two seasons. He played for the Buffalo Bills from 1977 to 1978. He was named to the 1976 College Football All-America Team as a defensive tackle while playing college football at Oklahoma State University.

Footnotes

1955 births
1989 deaths
American football defensive tackles
American football defensive ends
Buffalo Bills players
Oklahoma State Cowboys football players